Patrolman is a 1988 Filipino action film directed by Cesar SB. Abella and starring stuntman Baldo Marro as the titular patrolman. It also stars Melissa Mendez, Sunshine, Raoul Aragonn, Dick Israel, Zandro Zamora, Arwin Rogelio, and Odette Khan. Based on a true story, the film is about a dedicated and honest policeman who becomes a target of the New People's Army's Sparrow Unit. The film was produced by El Niño Films and released on December 25, 1988, as part of the 14th Metro Manila Film Festival (MMFF).

Patrolman won three MMFF awards, for Best Picture, Best Actor (Marro), and Best Supporting Actor (Israel). Marro's win for Best Actor is considered an upset by many, as Christopher de Leon was more critically favored for his performance in Magkano ang Iyong Dangal?. Critic Lav Diaz gave a negative review for the film, criticizing its excessive moralizing and unclear reason as to why the enemies would target the titular character.

Cast

Baldo Marro
Melissa Mendez
Sunshine
Raul Aragon
Dick Israel
Zandro Zamora
Odette Khan
Arwin Rogelio
Ramon 'Bong' Revilla Jr.
Robin Padilla
George Estregan Jr.
Philip Gamboa
King Gutierrez
Eddie Nicart
Robert Miller
Ushman Hassim
Romy Nario
Ernie David
Vic Varrion
Ernie Forte
Boy Ranay
Danny Labra
Nonong de Andres
Philip Henson
Edward Luna
Ray Alsona
Andrew Guevarra
Dave Guanson
Mark Tiongson
Billy Viña
Nemie Gutierrez
Jing Caparas
Donn de Vera
Benjie Corpuz
Bebeng Amora

Release
Patrolman was given a "P-15" rating by the Movie and Television Review and Classification Board (MTRCB), and was released on December 25, 1988, as part of the 14th Metro Manila Film Festival (MMFF).

Box office
On its opening day, Patrolman grossed ₱381 thousand, the least grossing film among the six MMFF films. By January, however, the film was able to surpass Itanong Mo sa Buwan, and ranked fifth out of all the entries to the festival.

Critical response
Lav Diaz, writing for the Manila Standard, gave Patrolman a negative review, criticizing the film for putting excessive emphasis on its theme of the ideal policeman in both dialogue and visuals, with his own review being titled "Propaganda of the police". He also questioned why the Sparrow team of young rebels and hitmen targeted Marro's character, an overall righteous policeman, without a clear reason for doing so. However, Diaz admitted that the film is able to effectively hit upon a person's conscience, accidental or otherwise.

MMFF Best Actor controversy
Baldo Marro, a stuntman who had solely received supporting roles before Patrolman, won the MMFF Award for Best Actor. His win is generally considered an upset by many, as he beat out favored actor Christopher de Leon, who received acclaim for his performance in Magkano ang Iyong Dangal?. Actress Armida Siguion-Reyna expressed the sentiment that both de Leon and Mark Gil, the latter from Itanong Mo sa Buwan, were more deserving of the MMFF Best Actor award than Marro, stating that "I like Baldo – but that is beside the point. Let us not be cruel to him by making him believe that what he did is great acting."

Accolades

Sequel
A sequel, Amok: Patrolman 2, was released in 1989.

See also
Films which also depict the New People's Army's Sparrow Unit:
Target: Sparrow Unit (1987)
Ambush (1988)
Alex Boncayao Brigade (1989)

References

External links

1988 films
1988 action films
Action films based on actual events
Filipino-language films
Films about police officers
Philippine action films